"Rock Bottom Riser" is a single by Smog from his 2005 album A River Ain't Too Much to Love. Pitchfork Media rated it 7.4/10.

The song was covered by German singer Gudrun Gut.

Track listing
"Rock Bottom Riser" (LP version)
"I Feel Like the Mother of the World" (LP version)
"Bowery"
"Fools Lament"

Videos
"Rock Bottom Riser"
"I Feel Like the Mother of the World"

References

2006 singles
Bill Callahan (musician) songs
Songs written by Bill Callahan (musician)
Drag City (record label) singles